Rank comparison chart of officers for navies of Arabophone states.

Officers

References

Military comparisons